is a Japanese actress and singer. She was represented with ABC inc. As a singer she is nicknamed .

Filmography

Films

TV dramas

Music programmes

NHK Kōhaku Uta Gassen entries

Others

Radio

DVD

Stage

Discography

Singles

Albums

Bibliography

References

External links
 – Wayback Machine (Archived from 26 September 2016) 
 – Ameba Blog 
Michiko Kawai on Kinenote 
Michiko Kawai on the TV Drama Database 
 

Actresses from Kanagawa Prefecture
People from Hiratsuka, Kanagawa
1968 births
Living people